is a former Japanese footballer who last played for Kagoshima United FC.

Career
After a decade in football spent in Kagoshima between JFL and pro-football, Yamada opted to retire in January 2018, being nominated as a coach in Kagoshima United FC youth ranks.

Club statistics
Updated to 23 February 2018.

References

External links

Profile at Kagoshima United FC

1988 births
Living people
Association football people from Kagoshima Prefecture
Japanese footballers
J3 League players
Japan Football League players
Kagoshima United FC players
Association football forwards
People from Kagoshima